Brian Andrew Crain (born August 28, 1961) is an American attorney and politician. He became the state senator for Oklahoma's 39th senate district in 2004.

Early life 
Crain was born at Andrews Air Force Base, Maryland, to Harold and Joan Crain. Moving to Oklahoma City when he was three years old, Brian attended Putnam City Schools, graduating from Putnam City West Senior High School in 1979. Following high school, Brian graduated from the University of Oklahoma in 1983 with a B.B.A. in Management.

Crain served as an Assistant District Attorney in 1996. In 1999, he left to pursue a law practice focusing primarily on title and real property law. He practices law with Hanson & Holmes, PLC, in Tulsa.

Political career
In 2004, Crain was elected to his first term in the senate. His district is located in central Tulsa, Oklahoma. Crain pledged to focus on the fundamentals of state government: education, transportation and small business development. Crain claimed that small businesses are the economic engine of this state and require good schools and good roads in order to grow and develop.

Senate Committees
2015-2016
Appropriations
Appropriations Sub-Committee on Health and Human Services
Energy
Health and Human Services
Judiciary; Vice-Chairman

2013-2014
Appropriations
Appropriations Sub-Committee on Public Safety and Judiciary
Business and Commerce 
Health and Human Services; Chairman
Judiciary

2011-2012
Appropriations
Appropriations Sub-Committee on Natural Resources 
Health and Human Services; Chairman
Judiciary
Retirement and Insurance

2009-2010
Appropriations
Appropriations Sub-Committee on Health and Human Services; Chairman
General Government
Health and Human Services
Judiciary
 Retirement and Insurance

2007-2008
Appropriations
Appropriations Sub-Committee on Health and Social Services; Co-Chairman
General Government
Health and Human Resources
Judiciary

2005-2006
Appropriations
Appropriations Sub-Committee on Human Services 
General Government
Judiciary
Public Safety and Homeland Security 
Tourism and Wildlife

Election results

References

External links
 
 
 
 
 
 Map of Oklahoma Senate District 39

1961 births
Living people
University of Oklahoma alumni
Republican Party Oklahoma state senators
Politicians from Tulsa, Oklahoma
Lawyers from Tulsa, Oklahoma
21st-century American politicians